is a railway station located in the town of Mitane, Akita Prefecture, Japan, operated by the East Japan Railway Company (JR East).

Lines
Kita-Kanaoka Station is served by the Ōu Main Line, and is located  349.4 km from the terminus of the line at Fukushima Station.

Station layout
The station consists of a two opposed side platforms serving two tracks, connected to the station building by a footbridge. The station is unattended.

Platforms

History
The station was absorbed into the JR East network upon the privatization of the JNR on April 1, 1987. It has been unattended since May 2005. A new station building was completed in April 2006.

Passenger statistics
In fiscal 2008, the last for which published information is available.  the station was used by an average of 70 passengers daily (boarding passengers only).

Surrounding area
The station is located in a rural area of Mitane, with only a few houses nearby.

See also
 List of railway stations in Japan

References

External links

 JR East Station information 

Railway stations in Japan opened in 1952
Railway stations in Akita Prefecture
Ōu Main Line
Mitane, Akita